Woodstock Aerodrome  is located  east of Woodstock, New Brunswick, Canada. The aerodrome lies in the town of Grafton off Route 585.

References

Registered aerodromes in New Brunswick
Buildings and structures in Carleton County, New Brunswick
Transport in Carleton County, New Brunswick
Woodstock, New Brunswick